Hartland is a neighborhood in southeastern Lexington, Kentucky, United States. Its boundaries are Tates Creek Road to the west, Armstrong Mill Road to the east, the Lexington urban growth boundary to the south, and Kenesaw Drive to the north.

Neighborhood statistics
 Area: 
 Population: 703
 Population density: 1,199 people per square mile
 Median household income: $90,175 (2010)

References

Neighborhoods in Lexington, Kentucky